Volleyball at the 2017 Islamic Solidarity Games was held at Baku Crystal Hall, Azerbaijan from 11 to 21 May 2017.

Medalists

Medal table

Men

Preliminary round

Group A

|}

|}

Group B

|}

|}

Final round

Semifinals

|}

Bronze medal game

|}

Gold medal game

|}

Women

Preliminary round

|}

|}

Final round

Semifinals

|}

Bronze medal game

|}

Gold medal game

|}

References 
Results

2017 Islamic Solidarity Games
Islamic Solidarity Games
2017
Volleyball competitions in Azerbaijan